Dance of December Souls is the first full-length album by Katatonia. It was released on CD in 1993 by No Fashion Records and LP by Helion Records, released in the US in 1999 by Century Black. In 2004, record label Black Lodge reissued the album with all new artwork, but the band has stated on its website that it does not support this release for personal reasons. In 2007, the album was reissued, this time under Peaceville UK with a blue version of the original cover and all five songs from the Jhva Elohim Meth... The Revival EP appended as bonus tracks. In 2010, Svart Records released a double vinyl version, which also included all songs from the EP.

This album is the first release with Guillaume Le Huche as the bassist; prior to it, Anders Nyström had been contributing all guitar and bass guitar. The sound mixes the band's later style of doom metal with genres such as death metal and black metal.

Track listing 
 All music by Anders Nyström, all lyrics by Jonas Renkse.

Personnel 
Katatonia
 Jonas Renkse – vocals, drums, percussion
 Anders Nyström – guitars
 Guillaume Le Huche – bass

Additional musicians
 Dan Swanö – keyboards

Production
 Dan Swanö – mixing and engineering
 Peter Dahl – mastering
 Tom Martinsen – cover design, photos
 Lennart Kaltea – photos

References 

Katatonia albums
1993 debut albums
Albums produced by Dan Swanö
Black metal albums by Swedish artists